Erecek can refer to:

 Erecek, Ayvacık
 Erecek, Refahiye